Eddie Peng Yu-Yan (born 24 March 1982) is a Taiwanese actor, singer and model.

Personal life
Peng was born in Penghu, Taiwan. He moved to Vancouver, British Columbia, Canada at the age of thirteen. In 2000, he graduated from Sir Winston Churchill Secondary School. Subsequently, he was admitted to the University of British Columbia and majored in economics, but later dropped out to begin his acting career.

In March 2021, Peng announced support for cotton from Xinjiang in mainland China, after some companies had expressed concerns about human rights abuses.

Career

2002–2008: Beginnings
Peng began his career when he was cast as in Tomorrow by director Yang Daqing during a summer vacation in Taiwan. The drama is adapted from the Japanese manga series Asunaro Hakusho, written by Fumi Saimon. Peng built a teenage fan following after the romantic comedy gained popularity. In 2003, he took on his first leading role in the Taiwanese drama Scent of Love, which tells the story of two star-crossed lovers who transcend life and death to find one another in their many reincarnations.

In 2005, he starred in the idol drama When Dolphin Met Cat, portraying an autistic youth. To prepare himself for the filming, Peng took one month to learn how to interact with dolphins from a trained instructor. He then starred in Chinese xianxia drama Chinese Paladin and wuxia drama  The Young Warriors, which were extremely popular during their run and led to increased recognition for him in the Mainland.

Thereafter, Peng made his big screen debut in the movie Exit No.6 (2006), directed by Yu-Hsien Lin. The film put him on the radar of many film directors, including Tsui Hark who cast him in his 2008 romantic comedy, All About Women. In 2007, Peng was nominated as Best New Actor at the 44th Golden Horse Film Festival and Awards for his performance in My DNA Says I Love You.

2009–2010: Contractual disputes
In 2009, Peng was involved in a contract dispute lawsuit against his former manager, reaching the nadir of his career. However, during this period, Peng starred in the movie Hear Me, directed by Fen-Fen Cheng, about a delivery boy who falls for a hearing impaired girl and communicates with her using sign language. The film was released a week prior to the opening of the 21st Summer Deaflympics, and became the highest grossing locally produced movie at Taiwan's box office.

After winning the lawsuit in 2010, he released his debut EP titled It Has To Be You, which featured 5 songs under the management of Avex Group.

The same year, he starred as the male lead in the movie Close to You. In order to portray his role as a boxer, Peng trained for three months prior to filming. He was nominated in the Best Actor category at the 2nd Macau International Movie Festival for his performance.

2011–2013: Rising popularity
Peng achieved breakthrough with his performance in the 2011 teen film Jump Ashin!, directed by Yu-Hsien Lin. He reportedly trained eight months to portray an athlete. The film was a critical and commercial success. Peng earned nominations as Best Actor at the 48th Golden Horse Film Festival and 13th Taipei Film Festival, which marked the turning point of his career.

Thereafter, he starred in romance films Love You You and Love; police thriller Cold War; kungfu comedy Tai Chi 0 and Tai Chi Hero; showcasing his versatility.

In 2013, Peng starred in action film Unbeatable, playing a Mixed martial arts fighter. Peng practised boxing for four hours a day to portray his character. Unbeatable was the highest grossing local production at the Hong Kong box office, and received positive reviews. The film earned Peng nominations as Best Supporting Actor at the 33rd Hong Kong Film Award and 50th Golden Horse Film Festival and Awards. The same year, Peng starred in romantic comedy A Wedding Invitation alongside Bai Baihe. The film earned nearly 200 million yuan ($32 million) in China, making it the highest-grossing Chinese-South Korean production.

2014–present: Box office success
In 2014, Peng was cast as Wong Fei-hung in Rise of the Legend, the latest film about the iconic Kung-Fu master. He reportedly practiced 10 hours of martial arts every day to prepare for the role. Peng was nominated in the Best Actor category at the 34th Hong Kong Film Award. The same year, he starred in historical drama Sound of the Desert and coming-of-age film Fleet of Time, which were both commercial successes. Peng's achievements in both the film and television industry brought his career to a new height.

In 2015, Peng played a professional cyclist in sports film To the Fore. He reportedly received training and earned qualifications for competitive racing during filming. The film was selected to represent Hong Kong in the best foreign-language film category at the 88th Academy Awards. Peng was also appointed the first Chinese Goodwill Ambassador of the 2015 Tour de France. The same year, Peng starred alongside Shu Qi in romance film The Last Women Standing.

Peng achieved another breakthrough in 2016 with the film  Operation Mekong, where he portrayed a hardcore undercover agent along with veteran actor Zhang Hanyu. The film received critical acclaim, and is highest grossing Chinese cop film to date. He also starred in romance film Run for Love alongside Zhang Ziyi, police thriller Cold War 2 as an antagonist, war epic  Call of Heroes, and Zhang Yimou's historical epic The Great Wall.

In 2017, Peng co-starred in Han Han's film Duckweed alongside Deng Chao and Zanilia Zhao. The sleeper hit gained commercial and critical success. He then starred in war film Our Time Will Come directed by Ann Hui, playing a complicated anti-hero. Peng then headlined his first film, fantasy epic Wu Kong where he played the title character. The film was a box office success and grossed US$100 million at the box office.

In 2018, Peng stars in the wuxia film Hidden Man, directed by Jiang Wen.

In 2020, Peng starred in The Rescue, a thriller film directed  by Dante Lam which focuses on an emergency rescue operative. He is also set to star in period romance film Love After Love, directed by Ann Hui On-wah.

Filmography

Film

Television series

Discography

Extended plays

Singles

Music video

Bibliography

Awards and nominations

Forbes China Celebrity 100

References

External links
 

1982 births
Living people
21st-century Canadian male actors
21st-century Taiwanese male actors
Canadian people of Chinese descent
Canadian male actors of Taiwanese descent
Han Taiwanese
People from Penghu County
Naturalized citizens of Canada
People from Meixian District
Taiwanese emigrants to Canada
Taiwanese people of Hakka descent
Taiwanese male film actors
Taiwanese male television actors
University of British Columbia alumni
Taiwanese idols
Taiwanese male singers
21st-century Taiwanese singers
21st-century Canadian male singers